The Billboard 200, published in the Billboard magazine, is a weekly chart that ranks the highest-selling albums in the United States. The data is compiled by Nielsen SoundScan based on each album's weekly physical and digital sales. In 2001, 27 albums reached the top of the chart.

The first number-one album of the year was 1 by English rock band the Beatles, which reached the top in December 2000 and continued its run until early February 2001 for a total of eight weeks. Shaggy achieved his first number-one album with Hot Shot. It topped the chart for a total of six weeks and sold more than 5.5 million copies within the year. Staind's Break the Cycle topped the charts for three consecutive weeks in June and sold more than 4.2 million copies in 2001. NSYNC achieved the best-selling album within the first week, selling more than 1.8 million copies with Celebrity, 620,000 more than above earlier in the year. Furthermore, it was the tenth album to sell more than a million units in its first week sakes, since Nielsen SoundScan started collecting data in 1991. Furthermore, it was the third best-selling album of the year and was certified 5-times platinum by the Recording Industry Association of America (RIAA). Following her death, Aaliyah's reached the top for one week in September with her eponymous studio album.

Jay-Z earned his fourth number-one album in the US with The Blueprint. In its third week atop the chart, the record sold about 173,000 copies, the lowest for any number-one in the year. Ja Rule eventually achieved his second and most recent chart-topping album with Pain Is Love., dethroning Jay-Z in mid-October and topping the chart for two consecutive weeks. The last album to top the chart in 2001 was Weathered by American rock band Creed. It peaked at number one for four consecutive weeks in 2001 and continued for four weeks in January 2002. The album, released in November, was the eighth best-selling record of the year, selling about 3.5 million copies; it is certified 6-times platinum by the RIAA. Unusually, the year's best-selling record, Hybrid Theory by Linkin Park, was not able to top the Billboard 200. Instead the Beatles' 1 was crowned the most successful album of the year.

Number-ones

See also
2001 in music
List of number-one albums (United States)

Notes

References

2001
2001 record charts